Charles Norman Laird (20 May 1893 – 14 December 1968) was an Australian rules footballer who played for South Melbourne in the Victorian Football League (VFL).

Laird spent five seasons with South Melbourne and is best known for his performance in the 1918 VFL Grand Final. Playing in the forward pocket, Laird kicked three goals in the match including the match winner in the final minute when he soccered the ball through for a goal. Earlier in the season, Laird kicked three goals in the last five minutes of the match to help South Melbourne defeat Carlton Football Club.

His twin brother Frank Laird also played for South Melbourne.

References

Sources
 Atkinson, G. (1982) Everything you ever wanted to know about Australian rules football but couldn't be bothered asking, The Five Mile Press: Melbourne. .

External links

1893 births
1968 deaths
Sydney Swans players
Sydney Swans Premiership players
Australian rules footballers from New South Wales
Paddington Australian Football Club players
One-time VFL/AFL Premiership players